A hydrant wrench is a tool used to remove fire hydrant caps and open the valve of the hydrant.  They are usually adjustable so as to fit different sized hydrant nuts.

In France

In France, The wrench is called "Guillemin wrench" (pronounced ), but the firefighters call it "tricoise wrench" (clef tricoise). The curved part applies on the ring, and the hooked part clutches a notch.

Big tricoise wrenches are placed in fire trucks, and are mainly used to fasten the big hoses, e.g. ∅110 mm hoses to feed the pumper tank from the hydrant (∅100 mm for the clutch). Small tricoise are made of brass and hang at the fire belts; they are used to fasten the small hoses, e.g., ∅70mm to ∅22mm hoses (∅65mm to ∅20mm clutches).

The shape is sometimes adapted so it can be used as a tool for other purposes; it is then called "polycoise wrench" or "Deschamps wrench". These tools are used to
 Open GDF standard gas enclosures and EDF standard electrical enclosures (12mm female triangle wrench);
 Open fire hydrants (15.6mm female triangle);
 Open doors without knobs, ventilation accesses and closets containing firefighting equipment in some public locations (5×5mm to 8×8mm square female wrenches);
 Open dry risers (12.5×12.5mm square female wrench);
 Open bathroom and toilet doors (screwdriver); and
 Remove nuts and bolts (13, 17 and 19mm six-point wrenches).

In the United States

The shape of a hydrant wrench is sometimes adapted so it can be used as a tool for other purposes, such as:
 Storz and spanner hose couplings
 Rocker lug couplings
 Water meter shutoff valves
 Gas cock valves
 Pentagonal nuts
 Square nuts.

References 

Firefighter tools
Water industry